Uber Carshare is an Australian company that facilitates peer-to-peer car rental, a system by which individuals may rent privately owned vehicles on an hourly or daily basis to other registered users of the service. It currently operates in locations across Australia including Sydney, Brisbane, Melbourne, Gold Coast, Hobart, Canberra, Adelaide and Perth and announced (in 2016) plans to expand to other Australian cities and airports. 

The founders appeared on season 2 of the Australian Shark Tank TV show in 2016 and secured an investment from 'shark' Steve Baxter. The startup also secured a  investment from Caltex Australia (later Ampol) the same year.

Hyundai invested in the company in 2019, and listed a number of its electric Ioniq vehicles for sharing through the platform. 

On 20 January 2022, the company was acquired by Uber for an undisclosed sum. This was Uber's first Australian acquisition.

In November 2022, Car Next Door rebranded and started operating as Uber Carshare. Car Next Door had been operating independently since Uber's takeover, with co-founder Will Davies as chief executive, but the brand [Car Next Door] disappeared in early November, bringing to a close a journey that lasted 10 years since its beginnings in Sydney.

How it works
The company addresses the lack of trust and lack of ease that would otherwise discourage people from sharing their cars with others, by:

Providing an online forum where vehicle owners and borrowers are registered, vetted, and approved;
Providing a feedback system to allow vehicle condition and member behaviour to be rated and reported by other members;
Providing in-car technology that enables keyless access to the car, and an automated, web-based booking platform;
Providing in-car GPS technology that tracks the car's location, reducing the risk of theft and misuse of the vehicle; 
Providing insurance covering owners and borrowers; and
Handling payments between owners and borrowers.

See also
Alternatives to car use
Car rental
Carsharing
Carpooling
Collaborative consumption

References

External links
 

Carsharing
Companies based in Sydney
Peer-to-peer
Online marketplaces of Australia
Online automotive companies
Uber
2022 mergers and acquisitions